Kryvorivnia is a village in the Verkhovyna Raion of the Ivano-Frankivsk Oblast of Ukraine. It is considered both the traditional summer and the winter capital of the Hutsul people. Kryvorivnia belongs to Verkhovyna settlement hromada, one of the hromadas of Ukraine.

Shadows of Forgotten Ancestors
The film Shadows of Forgotten Ancestors by Sergei Parajanov was filmed in the village. The house where the filming took place is now a museum.

Notable residents 
Burachynsky Andriy Colonel, military doctor of medicine, head of the UGA medical service.
Tit-Yevhen Burachynsky Ukrainian physician and public figure
Yaroslav Markiyanovych Chuperchuk Ukrainian folklorist, choreographer
Yakibyuk Vasyl, Master of woodcarving and brass making.
Gardetska Kekilia (1898-1961) Ukrainian writer, journalist, and public figure.
Mykola Potyak (1930-2019) Ukrainian physician and public figure

References

Verkhovyna Raion
Hutsuls
Villages in Verkhovyna Raion